The 2008 IIHF Women's World Championships were held from 4 to 12 April 2008, in Harbin, People's Republic of China. The games took place at the event's main arena, Baqu Arena. It was the 11th holding of the IIHF Women's World Championship and was organized by the International Ice Hockey Federation (IIHF). The Division I tournament was played in Ventspils, Latvia, at the Ice Hall of the Ventspils Olimpiskais Centrs from March 10 through March 16, 2008.

Promotions and relegations reflected the results of the 2007 Women's World Ice Hockey Championships.

Top Division

Preliminary round

Group A

All times local (GMT+8).

Group B

All times local (GMT+8).

Group C

All times local (GMT+8).

Qualifying round

Group D (1–3 Place) 

All times local (GMT+8).

Group E (4–6 Place)

All times local (GMT+8).

Consolation round

Group F (7–9 Place) 

All times local (GMT+8).

 is relegated to Division I for the 2009 Women's World Ice Hockey Championships due to having the worst goal difference in the consolation round, as all three teams won 1 game and amassed exactly 3 points each.

Final round

Match for third place 
All times local (GMT+8).

Final
All times local (GMT+8).

Final standings

Source:

Awards and Statistics

Scoring leaders
GP = Games played; G = Goals; A = Assists; Pts = Points; +/− = Plus-minus; PIM = Penalties In MinutesSource: IIHF.com

Goaltending leaders
(minimum 40% team's total ice time)

TOI = Time on ice (minutes:seconds); GA = Goals against; GAA = Goals against average; Sv% = Save percentage; SO = ShutoutsSource: IIHF.com

Directorate Awards
Goaltender: Noora Räty, 
Defenseman: Angela Ruggiero, 
Forward: Natalie Darwitz, 
Source: IIHF.com

Media All-Stars
Goaltender:  Noora Räty
Defensemen:  Julie Chu,  Emma Laaksonen
Forwards:  Jayna Hefford,  Hayley Wickenheiser,  Natalie Darwitz
MVP:  Noora Räty
Source:

Division I
The following teams took part of the Division I tournament, which was played in Ventspils, Latvia, at the Ice Hall of the Ventspils Olimpiskais Centrs from March 10 through March 16, 2008.

Round-robin
All times local (UTC+2)

Statistics

 Scoring leaders 
GP = Games played; G = Goals; A = Assists; Pts = Points; +/− = Plus-minus; PIM = Penalties In MinutesSource: IIHF.com

 Goaltenders 
(minimum 40% team's total ice time)

TOI = Time on ice (minutes:seconds); GA = Goals against; GAA = Goals against average; Sv% = Save percentage; SO = ShutoutsSource: IIHF.com

Directorate Awards
Goaltender: Zuzana Tomčíková, 
Defenseman: Tatyana Shtelmaister, 
Forward: Iveta Koka, 

Source: IIHF.com

Division II
All times local (UTC+2)

Statistics

 Scoring leaders 
GP = Games played; G = Goals; A = Assists; Pts = Points; +/− = Plus-minus; PIM = Penalties In MinutesSource: IIHF.com

 Goaltending leaders 
(minimum 40% team's total ice time)

TOI = Time on ice (minutes:seconds); GA = Goals against; GAA = Goals against average; Sv% = Save percentage; SO = ShutoutsSource: IIHF.com

Directorate Awards
Goaltender:  Sandra Borschke
Defenseman:  Linda de Rocco
Forward:  Denise Altmann

Source: IIHF.com

Division III
All times local (UTC+2)

Statistics

 Scoring leaders 
GP = Games played; G = Goals; A = Assists; Pts = Points; +/− = Plus-minus; PIM = Penalties In MinutesSource: IIHF.com

 Goaltending leaders 
(minimum 40% team's total ice time)

TOI = Time on ice (minutes:seconds); GA = Goals against; GAA = Goals against average; Sv% = Save percentage; SO = ShutoutsSource: IIHF.com

Directorate Awards
Goaltender:  Ksenija Božnar
Defenseman:  Diana Krušelj-Posavec
Forward:  Angela Taylor
MVP:  Jasmina Rošar
Source: IIHF.com

Division IV
The Division IV tournament was held in Miercurea-Ciuc, Romania at Lajos Vákár Ice Hall during 23 to 29 March 2008. is promoted to Division III for the 2009 Women's World Ice Hockey Championships.''

Round-robin
All times local (UTC+2)

Awards and Statistics

Scoring leaders
GP = Games played; G = Goals; A = Assists; Pts = Points; +/− = Plus-minus; PIM = Penalties In MinutesSource: IIHF.com

Goaltending leaders
(minimum 40% team's total ice time)

TOI = Time on ice (minutes:seconds); GA = Goals against; GAA = Goals against average; Sv% = Save percentage; SO = ShutoutsSource: IIHF.com

Directorate Awards
Goaltender:  Karítas Halldórsdóttir
Defenseman:  Annabelle Lewis
Forward:  Magdolna Dobondi

Source: IIHF.com

References

External links
IIHF Official Site
Complete results

IIHF results index for 2008

IIHF Women's World Ice Hockey Championships
World
2008
2008 in Chinese women's sport
April 2008 sports events in Asia
Sport in Harbin
Women's ice hockey in China
Sport in Heinola
Vierumäki
2007–08 in Asian ice hockey